The 2018–19 Algerian Ligue Professionnelle 1 was the 57th season of the Algerian Ligue Professionnelle 1 since its establishment in 1962. A total of 16 teams contested in the league.

Teams
16 teams contest the league. MO Bejaia, Ain M'lila and CABB Arreridj were promoted from the 2017-18 Ligue 2.

Stadiums
Note: Table lists in alphabetical order.
All Derby matches between CR Belouizdad, MC Alger, NA Hussein Dey, USM Alger and Paradou AC will be played on July 5, 1962 Stadium which seats 64,000 spectators.

Personnel and kits

Foreign players

League table

Results

Positions by round

Clubs season-progress

Season statistics

Top scorers

Updated to games played on 26 May 2019 Source: soccerway.com

Hat-tricks

Clean sheets

* Only goalkeepers who played all 90 minutes of a match are taken into consideration.
Updated to games played in August 2018

Presidential elections Protests 2019  
Immediately after the announcement of several parties in the social networking sites on the events of Friday, February 22 against the fifth term of the current President Abdelaziz Bouteflika, LFP announced the suspension of a match between MC Alger vs MC Oran for round 22 and JSM Bejaia vs Paradou AC in the Algerian Cup. On 24 February 2019, The match between the CR Belouizdad vs DRB Tadjenanet were suspended, Which was to play on Tuesday, also has been delayed 3 games In addition, the matches USM Alger vs Paradou AC of Ligue 1 23rd day, US Biskra vs JSM Skikda and ASM Oran vs RC Relizane of Ligue 2 24th day, initially fixed for Friday 1 March are staggered to Saturday 2 March. A day later, another match was suspended in the Ligue 1 between USM Bel Abbès and JS Saoura, in Ligue 2 Also postponed another match ASO Chlef vs JSM Bejaia. To be the sixth match postponed since the beginning of the demonstrations.

Media coverage

See also
2018–19 Algerian Ligue Professionnelle 2
2018–19 Algerian Cup

Notes

References

Algerian Ligue Professionnelle 1 seasons
Algeria
1